Todor Božinov (born April 29, 1998) is a Macedonian professional basketball Point guard who currently plays for Kožuv in the Macedonian First League.

External links
 at Eurobasket
 at Balkanleague
 at RealGM
 at BGBasket

References

1998 births
People from Gevgelija
Macedonian men's basketball players
Living people
Point guards